"You Were Made for Me" is a song by American singer-songwriter Sam Cooke, released on March 24, 1958 by Keen Records. The song peaked at number seven on Billboard Hot R&B Sides chart, and also charted within the top 40 of the Billboard Hot 100.

Not to be confused with the song of the same name composed by Mitch Murray and recorded 1963 by Freddie & The Dreamers.

Charts

References

1958 singles
Sam Cooke songs
Songs written by Sam Cooke
1958 songs
Soul ballads
Keen Records singles